The communauté de communes des Hautes Terres en Haut Berry  was located in the Cher département of the Centre-Val de Loire region of France. It was created in January 2003. It was merged into the new Communauté de communes Terres du Haut Berry in January 2017.

Member communes 
It comprised the following 10 communes:

 Achères 	
 Aubinges
 La Chapelotte
 Henrichemont
 Humbligny
 Montigny
 Morogues
 Neuilly-en-Sancerre
 Neuvy-Deux-Clochers
 Saint-Céols

References 

Hautes Terres en Haut Berry